Gerald Michael Browne (194330 August 2004) was professor emeritus of classics at the University of Illinois. He was a founding editor, in 1988, of the Journal of Coptic Studies. The principal biographical study of his life is an article by Vincent W.J. van Gerven Oei.

Selected publications
 Documentary papyri from the Michigan collection. A.M. Hakkert, Toronto, 1970. (American Studies in Papyrology Vol. 6)
 The Papyri of the Sortes Astrampsychi. A. Hain, Meisenheim am Glan, 1974.
 Michigan Coptic texts. Papyrologica Castroctaviana, Barcelona, 1979.
 Introduction to Old Nubian. Akademie-Verlag, Berlin, 1989.
 Literary texts in Old Nubian. Verein der Förderer der Sudanforschung, Wien-Mödling, 1989.
 Old Nubian texts from Qaṣr Ibrīm. 2. Egypt Exploration Society, London, 1989.
 The old Nubian miracle of Saint Menas. Mödling, Wien, 1994.
 Old Nubian grammar. Lincom Europa, Muenchen, 2002.

References

External links
 

1943 births
2004 deaths
University of Illinois faculty
American classical scholars
American papyrologists
Philologists